Martell Robinson (born October 16, 1976), known by the stage name Jasmine Masters, is an American drag queen, internet celebrity, YouTuber, and stand-up comedian. He is best known for competing on the seventh season of RuPaul's Drag Race and RuPaul's Drag Race All Stars season 4. Robinson is responsible for several viral videos, many of which have become memes, most notably And I Oop! which was the most used gif of 2019.

Early life 
Martell Robinson was born on October 16, 1976 in Los Angeles County, California. He first did drag in 1997 at the age of 21 by impersonating Patti LaBelle. The drag name "Jasmine Masters" came from Jasmine Guy and her drag mother, Destiny Masters. He auditioned for Drag Race beginning with Season two.

Career 
Before Drag Race, Robinson appeared as the character, Mordecai, in the 2008 film First Sunday. He also appeared with fellow Drag Race alumnus Willam for an episode of The New Normal in 2013.

RuPaul's Drag Race
Jasmine was announced as one of the fourteen contestants for season seven of RuPaul's Drag Race on March 2, 2015. She was eliminated in the third episode after lip-syncing against Kennedy Davenport, and placed 12th overall. During her time on the show, she received online death threats including racist remarks, which eventually led to RuPaul defending Masters on Twitter. Masters would be referenced in 2017 by Nina Bo'Nina Brown for season nine of Drag Race, with Brown impersonating her for the annual "Snatch Game".

Masters competed on the Drag Race television special RuPaul's Drag Race Holi-slay Spectacular. Masters later posted a YouTube video explaining why she wasn't featured as much as the other contestants in the special, stating that Shangela was late during one of the rehearsals, which caused Masters to become frustrated and leave the set early.

Masters was announced to compete on the fourth season of RuPaul's Drag Race All Stars. She was eliminated in the first episode by Trinity the Tuck after her poor stand-up performance for the annual talent show, placing 10th. She had a chance to return in sixth episode, where the eliminated queens faced off with the queens still in running, but lost a lip sync to Trinity, eliminating her for good.

She appeared as a guest for the first challenge in the premiere of season eleven of Drag Race.

After Drag Race
After Drag Race, she was one of thirty drag queens featured in Miley Cyrus's 2015 VMA performance.

Masters gained notoriety with her self-published YouTube videos on her channel. Her video "RuPaul Dragrace fucked up drag", criticizing the show's portrayal of drag, sparked criticism from fans and queens including Phi Phi O'Hara. The video was featured in Willam's internet show, "Willam's Beatdown". Her video "Fix ur breath" was featured in a post on Justin Bieber's Instagram page, making Masters go viral.

Because of Masters's viral success, she is the host of her own web show with WowPresents called "Jasmine Masters Master Class" that premiered its first episode in 2018. She also was featured as a guest in an episode of Lemme Pick You Up with Ts Madison. She was a guest for multiple episodes of the web series "Wait, What?" with Kimora Blac.

She was with Tammie Brown, Miz Cracker, Eureka O'Hara, Shea Coulee and Ginger Minj for two episodes of the Billboard web series "Spillin' The Tea" in June 2018. She was with Trixie Mattel to discuss the Drag Race season ten contestants for Access.

Masters appeared in the music video for Latrice Royale's "Excuse the Beauty" on May 10, 2018 and Pandora Boxx's "Oops I Think I Pooped" on September 24, 2018.

Masters featured on the single "And I Oop!" by Adam Joseph in June 2019.

She is also working on a podcast called The Wake and Bake with Honey Davenport.

In popular culture 

A clip of Masters interrupting herself in shock, known as "And I Oop", became an internet meme in 2019. It originated from a 2015 YouTube video named "Jasmine Masters handle your liquor". According to Giphy, Masters' "And I Oop" was the most used gif of 2019, with over 419 million views. Masters also trademarked the term.

Discography

Singles

As featured artist

Filmography

Movies

Television

Music videos

Web series

Awards and nominations

References

External links 
 

1977 births
Living people
African-American drag queens
LGBT African Americans
American YouTubers
LGBT people from California
American gay actors
Gay comedians
LGBT YouTubers
Jasmine Masters
Jasmine Masters
Shorty Award winners
20th-century American LGBT people
21st-century American LGBT people
American LGBT comedians